Sunnyi Melles (born 7 October 1958 in Luxembourg, Luxembourg) is a Hungarian / Swiss actress active in Germany and Austria.

Biography
She is the only daughter of Austrian orchestral conductor Carl Melles and Hungarian noblewoman Judith von Rohonczy (1929-2001), an actress, daughter of actress Ila Lóth. Since 1993, she has been married to Prince Peter of Sayn-Wittgenstein-Sayn (b. 1954), son of photographer Marianne, Princess zu Sayn-Wittgenstein-Sayn. They have a son and a daughter:

 Constantin Victor Ludwig, Prince zu Sayn-Wittgenstein-Sayn (b. 1994) 
 Leonille Elisabeth Judith Maria Anna, Princess zu Sayn-Wittgenstein-Sayn (b. 1996).

Selected filmography
Derrick - Season 8, Episode 8: "Prozente" (1981, TV series episode), as Alice Hollerer
Die Leidenschaftlichen (1982, TV film), as Charlotte
 (1982), as Marlene Schulz
Tatort:  (1983, TV series episode), as Miriam Schultheiss
The Roaring Fifties (1983), as Bambi
Rote Erde (1983, TV series), as Sylvia von Kampen
 (1986), as Angelika
Maschenka (1987), as Lilli
'38 – Vienna Before the Fall (1987), as Carola
 (1988), as Gretchen (with Helmut Griem as Faust)
 (1989), as Gabriele Gessmann
Mit den Clowns kamen die Tränen (1990, TV miniseries), as Norma Desmond
Ich schenk dir die Sterne (1991), as Laura Montesi
Maigret: Maigret at the Crossroads (1992, TV series episode), as Else
The Rat (1997, TV film), as Damroka
Long Hello and Short Goodbye (1999), as Aurelia
Olgas Sommer (2004), as Ella
 (2012), as Franziska Schnidt
 (2013, TV miniseries), as Ottilie Schadt
Altes Geld (2015), as Liane Rauchensteiner
Der Bauer zu Nathal (2018)
Kaisersturz as German Empress Augusta Victoria
The Awakening of Motti Wolkenbruch (2018), as Mrs. Silberzweig
Enfant Terrible (2020)
Triangle of Sadness (2022)
Kaiser Karl (TBA), as Marlene Dietrich

References

External links

German television actresses
Austrian film actresses
Austrian stage actresses
Austrian television actresses
20th-century Austrian actresses
21st-century Austrian actresses
1958 births
Living people
German film actresses
German stage actresses
People from Luxembourg City
20th-century German actresses
21st-century German actresses
German people of Hungarian-Jewish descent
Luxembourgian people of Hungarian descent